Forestella (Korean: 포레스텔라) is a South Korean crossover male vocal quartet formed through the JTBC singing competition Phantom Singer 2, which aired in 2017. They won first place on the show and officially debuted on March 14, 2018, with the album Evolution. Since their debut, they have released another two studio albums and gained public recognition for their performances on Immortal Songs: Singing the Legend, festivals and other televised concerts.

History

Background
The quartet was formed through the second season of the singing competition Phantom Singer. Cho Min-Kyu, Ko Woo-rim, Bae Doo-hoon, and  Kang Hyung-ho each separately auditioned for the competition. During the competition, Cho Min-Kyu selected ko Woo-rim for the 2nd round competition and trained him. Then, He selected Bae Doo-hoon for the 3rd round competition to add variety to the team color. In the final competition, Kang Hyung-Ho joined the team. Cho Min-Kyu got the title " Strategist" during the competition because he built the character of the Forestella music. The quartet prior to the finals named themselves "Forestella", which is a portmanteau of "forest" and "stella" (Italian: star). As the winning group, they won prize money as well as an exclusive contract with Arts & Artists, which manages some of the country's preeminent classical musicians, to promote together for a year.

Bae is a musical actor who had studied acting at Korea National University of Arts and occasionally sang for a gugak-rock fusion band. He previously appeared in Hidden Singer and The Voice of Korea prior to auditioning for Phantom Singer. Cho and Ko are the only classically-trained singers of the quartet and are alumni of Seoul National University's famed College of Music. Cho had been planning to continue with graduate studies in Germany and was a member of the Seoul Metropolitan Opera for several years. Ko was then a third-year undergraduate voice major who had been a finalist and semi-finalist in several vocal competitions. Kang is the only member without any formal training in either music or the performing arts, although he was the vocalist of an amateur rock band he and some friends had formed as college students. He was a chemical engineer and researcher at Lotte and took a temporary leave of absence to audition, eventually resigning after Forestella debuted.

2017: Phantom Singer 2
While on Phantom Singer 2, the members already differentiated themselves from other contestants for their willingness to experiment with other genres and for their "adventurous" song selections, a reputation which persists to this day. Bae, Cho and Ko had been grouped together in the same team during the first quartet stage and were the first team to perform a rock song, Imagine Dragons's "Radioactive", in its original style rather than rearranging it. Kang, despite his background as a vocalist in a rock band, had demonstrated his versatility performing various genres with other contestants. As Forestella, they surprised viewers with a tango-pop rock arrangement of Claudio Baglioni's "Come Un Eterno Addio" during the second final stage.

2018: Debut
Forestella debuted on March 14, 2018, with the full-length album Evolution, which was praised by critics for showcasing the members' vocal abilities and reinterpretations of songs from a wide spectrum of genres. They held a series of concerts in Seoul before embarking on a nationwide tour in nine cities. After their tour ended, they held a series of joint concerts with Forte di Quattro, winners of the first season of Phantom Singer. During the latter half of the year, they gained further public recognition through their appearances on the KBS singing show Immortal Songs: Singing the Legend, especially after winning Episode 374, their first win on the show.

2019–2020: Second album and continued success
In Episode 392 of Immortal Songs, which aired on February 23, 2019, the group covered "Bohemian Rhapsody" and the video of their performance uploaded by KBS went viral among both domestic and international fans, spawning numerous reaction videos. They caught the attention of Secret Garden who collaborated with them to record a Korean-language remake of "Beautiful". The song was pre-released as a digital single by Secret Garden and later included in the South Korean and Japanese releases of their album Storyteller.

On May 22, 2019, Forestella released their second full-length album Mystique, to both critical and popular acclaim. One of the tracks, "Dear Moon" (달하 노피곰 도다샤), was released as a promotional digital single two weeks prior and was based on a Baekje-era poem entitled "Jeongeupsa" (정읍사). It was one of the best-selling albums in the domestic classical charts, becoming certified "platinum" by December, and they became only one of three classical artists to have an album sell more than the "gold" certification that year.

In September 2019, the group decided to continue promoting together and renewed their group contract. Cho and Bae joined other agencies for their solo activities. Bae returned to musical theater while Cho and Kang both released songs as solo artists. Ko opted against a solo career in favor of continuing his studies, although he has performed at various classical recitals and concerts.

On April 9, 2020, Forestella released a digital single, a remake of the song "Nella Fantasia", a more traditional classical crossover song. This was followed by another digital single "Together" (함께라는 이유), which falls into the pop genre, and an accompanying music video. "Together" was composed for them by the songwriter and producer Hwang Sung-je, who has composed or arranged for notable singers and K-pop groups including BoA, Shinhwa, Girls' Generation, Sung Si-kyung and Yoon Jong-shin. In August they were awarded the National Assembly's Culture Sports and Tourism Committee Award at the Newsis Hallyu Culture Daesang. They then released another two digital singles: "Words from the Wind" (바람이 건네준 말) and "Ties" (연(緣)). Although the members have always been actively involved in the production and arrangement of their releases, "Words from the Wind" was the first time they were officially credited as co-composers.

2021–present: Third album
Beginning in January 2021, a 12-episode "All Star" edition of Phantom Singer was aired and Forestella were among the returning teams as the winners of the second season. They then released their third full-length album The Forestella digitally on April 19, while the physical album was released two weeks later. The four digital singles released the previous year were also included in the album. The album also included a Korean-language remake of Serge Lama's hit "Je suis malade"; they had covered the song in its original French that year on Phantom Singer All Star and earned praise from Lama himself.

According to statistics compiled by the Korea Performing Arts Box Office Information System (KOPIS), Forestella ranked first in ticket sales within the "classical and opera" category for the first half of 2021. Despite multiple postponements and some of the dates of their Nella Fantasia: Time Travel and The Forestella tours having to be spread out over several months due to COVID-19 restrictions, three of the concerts ranked in the top 5 best-selling concerts within that category. On August 2, it was announced that the group signed with Beat Interactive after terminating their contract with their previous management two months earlier, although the individual members remain under their respective agencies for their solo activities. However their previous management would remain in charge of The Forestella tour as per their agreement since it had been scheduled prior to the contract termination.

In the 2021 Brand of the Year Awards, which took place on September 7, they were named Crossover Group of the Year.

Members
Bae Doo-hoon (배두훈) - musical actor, baritone~tenor range
Kang Hyung-ho (강형호) - rock, tenor~soprano range
Cho Min-kyu (조민규) - leader of Forestella,  tenor
Ko Woo-rim (고우림) - bass

Artistry
Known to domestic audiences for their appearances on Immortal Songs and KBS's televised public concerts Open Concert, the group has demonstrated their versatility in reinterpreting songs of various genres ranging from trot to gugak (traditional Korean music) and incorporating rock, pop and classical singing techniques into their performances. The diversity of their repertoire is apparent through the artists and ensembles they have performed together with, which include classical crossover tenor Paul Potts, gugak performers Song So-hee and Ahn Sook-sun and pop singer Jang Hye-jin. The members have stated that they never felt the need to limit themselves to any specific genre and preferred to experiment and draw inspiration from their varied individual musical preferences. When asked about why they ventured into the crossover genre, Cho and Ko both expressed their dissatisfaction with the limited repertoire they were given as singers trained in the Western classical opera tradition and hoped to challenge the conservatism still prevalent within the classical music community. The quartet have been praised by commentators for breaking barriers in the domestic music scene which existed between classically-trained singers and other genres.

Forestella initially drew comparisons to Forte di Quattro, who won the first season of Phantom Singer. Newsis opined that "if Forte di Quattro is masculine and luxurious, Forestella has a lively energy that doesn't know where to go. If Forte di Quattro feels like a gentleman, Forestella feels like an adventure full of dreams, hopes and adventures." However, unlike their Phantom Singer predecessors, Forestella's sound has been described as "leaning towards pop". Regardless of genre, their performances are generally characterized by well-defined harmonies and their unusually wide combined vocal range, anchored by Kang and Ko's countertenor and basso profondo tessiture respectively.

Discography

Studio albums

Extended plays

Singles

As lead artist

Collaborations

Participation releases

Filmography

Television

Tours
Solo concerts and tours
 Evolution Tour (2018)
 Forest and Stars Concerts (2018)
 Mystique Tour (2019)
 Winter Forest Concerts (2019)
 Nella Fantasia: Time Travel Tour (2020–21)
 The Forestella Tour (2021)
 The Royal in Seoul (2021, 2022)
 The Beginning : World Tree Tour (2022)
 LOVE IN SEOUL - Forestella (2022)

Joint concerts and tours
 Phantom Singer 2 Tour (2017-2018)
 Phantom vs Phantom Concerts (2018) (with Forte di Quattro)
 Illuso: Autumn's Masterpieces Concerts (2019) (with Forte di Quattro, Miraclass and Ingihyunsang)
 Phantom of Classic Concert (2019) (with Forte di Quattro and Miraclass)
 Phantom Singer All Star Gala Concerto (2021)

Awards and nominations

Notes

References

External links
Artist Profile on Melon Music

South Korean musical groups
Vocal quartets
Musical groups from Seoul
Musical groups established in 2018
2018 establishments in South Korea
Crossover (music)
Universal Music Group artists
Warner Music Group artists